Neoclytus jouteli is a species of beetle in the family Cerambycidae. It was described by Davis in 1904.

References

Neoclytus
Beetles described in 1904